Adaveeshaiah Puttaveeraswamy Gagan Ullalmath (Kannada: ಗಗನ್ ಉಳ್ಳಾಲಮಠ, born 8 January 1992), popularly known as Gagan Ullalmath, is an Indian swimmer. He is the only swimmer to represent India in the 2012 London Olympics. He finished 7th in heat 1 of 1500 m freestyle event with a time of 16:31:14 and was eventually knocked out at last position 31st.

Ullalmath was given a position to swim in the Olympics due to a universality quota, despite not reaching a qualifying standard.

See also
 Indian swimmers at London 2012

References

1992 births
Living people
Indian male swimmers
Indian male freestyle swimmers
Swimmers from Bangalore
Olympic swimmers of India
Swimmers at the 2012 Summer Olympics
South Asian Games gold medalists for India
South Asian Games medalists in swimming
20th-century Indian people
21st-century Indian people